The kukri is a type of knife associated with the Gurkhas of Nepal.

Kukri may also refer to:

 Kukri, Unnao, a village in India
 Kukri Hills, a mountain range in Victoria Land
 Kukri Peneplain, an unconformity in the Transantarctic Mountains
 Kukri Sports, a sportwear brand
 Oligodon, a genus of snakes
 Khukri-class corvette, an Indian Navy ship class
 Khukri Rum, a brand of rum
 Khukuri beer, a brand of beer
 Kukuri (film), a 2018 film